Smilax ecirrhata, the upright carrionflower, is a species of flowering plant in the Greenbriar family. It is native to Ontario and to the  central United States (Great Lakes Region and Mississippi/Ohio/Missouri Valley). It is found in rich, calcareous forests along floodplains. It is an herbaceous plant that has green umbels of flowers in late spring.

References

Smilacaceae
Flora of Ontario
Flora of the United States
Plants described in 1850
Flora without expected TNC conservation status